Frank Bowden may refer to:

Sir Frank Bowden, 1st Baronet (1848–1921), founder of the Raleigh Bicycle Company
Sir Frank Bowden, 3rd Baronet, of the Bowden baronets
Frank Bowden (footballer) (1904–?), English footballer
Frank Philip Bowden (1903–1968), Australian physicist
Frank Bowden (tennis) (1908–1977), American tennis player
Frank Prosser Bowden (1860–1932), public servant in Tasmania

See also
Bowden (disambiguation)